André Franc (11 January 1911 – 18 October 2000) was a French biologist and malacologist. He was once curator of molluscs at the Muséum national d'histoire naturelle in Paris. Franc died in October 2000 at the age of 89.

Publications
Mollusques terrestres et fluviatiles de l' archipel Néo-Calédonien (1956)
Traité de zoologie 2 - Spongiaires, cténaires, cnidaires with Pierre-Paul Grassé)
André Franc's profile at the Bibliothèque nationale de France

References

1911 births
2000 deaths
20th-century French zoologists
French malacologists
National Museum of Natural History (France) people